Svetlana Mikhailovna Lapina; born 12 April 1978) is a Russian high jumper.

Her personal best jump was 1.99 metres, achieved at the 1999 World Championships in Seville, where she won a surprising bronze medal.

Competition record

1978 births
Living people
Russian female high jumpers
Athletes (track and field) at the 2000 Summer Olympics
Olympic athletes of Russia
World Athletics Championships medalists
Universiade medalists in athletics (track and field)
Universiade silver medalists for Russia
Medalists at the 1999 Summer Universiade